Jennings Township is one of the twelve townships of Van Wert County, Ohio, United States.  The 2000 census found 695 people in the township, 623 of whom lived in the unincorporated portions of the township.

Geography
Located in the southeastern corner of the county, it borders the following townships:
Washington Township - north
Marion Township, Allen County - northeast
Spencer Township, Allen County - east
Salem Township, Auglaize County - south
Union Township, Mercer County - southwest
York Township - west
Ridge Township - northwest corner

Part of the village of Venedocia is located in northwestern Jennings Township, along the border with York Township.

Van Wert County's most southerly point is located in Jennings Township.  It is the only county township with a border on Auglaize County.

Name and history
Statewide, the only other Jennings Township is located in Putnam County.

Government
The township is governed by a three-member board of trustees, who are elected in November of odd-numbered years to a four-year term beginning on the following January 1. Two are elected in the year after the presidential election and one is elected in the year before it. There is also an elected township fiscal officer, who serves a four-year term beginning on April 1 of the year after the election, which is held in November of the year before the presidential election. Vacancies in the fiscal officership or on the board of trustees are filled by the remaining trustees.

References

External links
County website

Townships in Van Wert County, Ohio
Townships in Ohio